A splitter plate is a component in some jet aircraft, used to control the airflow into the engine. Where the engine air intake is mounted partway back along the fuselage or under the wing, the splitter plate diverts the boundary layer away from the engine intake. It is a form of boundary layer control.

Diverting the boundary layer
When a body, such as a wing or a fuselage, passes through a fluid such as the air, a boundary layer of fluid attaches to the body and moves along with it. If this layer enters the air intake of a jet engine, it can affect performance.

In order to stop this boundary layer problem from happening, a splitter plate may be used to separate the boundary layer from the fast-moving free airflow and divert it away from the engine intake.

Many splitter plates have a series of holes drilled into the surface closer to the engine side of the intake. Suction is applied to these holes, further reducing the boundary layer.

Aircraft 
 HAL Tejas
 McDonnell Douglas F-4 Phantom II
 Mikoyan-Gurevich MiG-23
 Sukhoi Su-15
 North American XB-70 Valkyrie
 Eurofighter Typhoon
 General Dynamics F-16 Fighting Falcon
 Saab JAS 39 Gripen
 Shenyang J-8
 Chengdu J-10
 Mikoyan Project 1.44

See also
Inlet cone
Intake ramp
Diverterless supersonic inlet
Diffuser (automotive) for automotive splitter plates

References

 
 

Aircraft propulsion components